The Hampshire Women's cricket team is the women's representative cricket team for the English historic county of Hampshire. They play their home games at various grounds across the county, including Totton and Eling CC and the Ageas Bowl Nursery Ground. They are captained by Emily Windsor. In 2018, they won Division One of the Women's County Championship, and were promoted from Division Two of the Women's Twenty20 Cup. They are partnered with the regional side Southern Vipers.

History

1811–1996: Early History
Hampshire Women played their first recorded match in 1811, against Surrey Women. They then went on to play various one-off matches against neighbouring counties, sometimes as a combined team with Dorset. They played against a touring Australia side in 1937 and 1957.

1997– : Women's County Championship
Hampshire Women joined the Women's County Championship for its inaugural season in 1997, finishing 3rd in Division 3. Over the following seasons, Hampshire remained in the lower divisions of the Championship: they were promoted to Division Two in 2002, but only remained there for two seasons, and reached as low as Division Four in 2008 and 2011. However, 2015 saw a sharp change in Hampshire's fortunes as they won Division 3 with six wins out of eight games, and then two seasons later were promoted to Division 1, topping Division Two in 2017. Hampshire then won Division One at their first attempt, in 2018, winning six of their seven matches. Hampshire's remarkable rise was helped by England captain Charlotte Edwards, who played for the club in 2017 and 2018, and overseas player Suzie Bates, who was the Division's leading run-scorer in their Championship-winning season.

Hampshire Women also had a similar rise in the Women's Twenty20 Cup. After playing in the lower regional divisions in the early years of the tournament, they gained promotion from Division 3 in 2015 and from Division 2 in 2018, topping the league with 7 wins from 8 games. Hampshire bowler Providence Cowdrill was the leading wicket-taker in the division, with 15 wickets. In 2019, their first season in Division 1, they finished 4th with 4 wins. In 2021, they played in the South East Group of the Twenty20 Cup, finishing 3rd with 3 wins. Hampshire bowler Finty Trussler was the leading wicket-taker across the whole competition, with 16 wickets at an average of 6.50. They finished third in their group of the 2022 Women's Twenty20 Cup. They also joined the South Central Counties Cup in 2022, and won the inaugural edition of the tournament, going unbeaten.

Players

Current squad
Based on appearances in the 2022 season.  denotes players with international caps.

Notable players
Players who have played for Hampshire and played internationally are listed below, in order of first international appearance (given in brackets):

 Betty Snowball (1934)
 Charlotte Edwards (1996)
 Suzie Bates (2006)
 Katie George (2018)
 Maia Bouchier (2021)
 Charlie Dean (2021)

Seasons

Women's County Championship

Women's Twenty20 Cup

Honours
 County Championship:
 Division One champions (1) – 2018
 Division Two champions (1) – 2017
 Division Three champions (2) – 2002 & 2015
 Women's Twenty20 Cup
 Division Two champions (1) – 2018

See also
 Hampshire County Cricket Club
 Southern Vipers

Notes

References

Women's cricket teams in England
Cricket in Hampshire